J.L. Turner and Son Building is a historic building in Scottsville, Allen County, Kentucky, USA.

History
The building was completed circa 1910. It housed Davidson Bros, a wholesale and poultry firm, from 1916 to 1926. It was acquired by James Luther Turner and his son, Cal Turner, the co-founders of J.L. Turner & Son, in 1939. 

By 1956, their business was named Dollar General; it later became a corporation traded on the New York Stock Exchange.

It has been listed on the National Register of Historic Places since November 21, 2001. It now houses Community Action of Southern Kentucky.

References

Commercial buildings on the National Register of Historic Places in Kentucky
National Register of Historic Places in Allen County, Kentucky
Dollar General
Commercial buildings completed in 1910
1920 establishments in Kentucky